Milford United are a Welsh football club from the town of Milford Haven, Pembrokeshire in the southwest of Wales. Formed in 1885, they had a long period playing in the Welsh Football League. The club currently play in the Pembrokeshire League Division Two.

History

The club played in the South Wales League in the 1908–09 season as well as playing in the Pembrokeshire League. They played in the Welsh Football League between the 1930s and 2003, when they resigned from the league. They were runners-up in Division One (then the highest level of the football league system in South Wales) in the 1948–49 season. After dropping out of the Welsh Football League, the club returned to the Pembrokeshire League.

Honours

 Welsh Football League Division One (Tier 1 of the Welsh Football League) - Runners-Up (1): 1948–49
 Welsh Football League Division One (Tier 2 of the Welsh Football League) - Runners-Up (2): 1970–71; 1977–78
 Welsh Football League Division Two  (Tier 3 of the Welsh Football Pyramid) - Runners-Up (1): 1999–2000
 Welsh Football League Division Two West (Tier 2 of the Welsh Football League) - Champions (2): 1936–37; 1962–63
 Welsh Football League Division Two (Tier 3 of the Welsh Football League) - Champions (1): 1976–77; 
 Welsh Football League Division Three (Tier 4 of the Welsh Football Pyramid) - Champions (1): 1997–98
 Welsh Football League Cup - Winners (1): 1938–39
 Welsh Football League Cup - Runners-Up (5): 1946–57; 1949–50; 1954–55; 1956–57; 1957–58
 Pembrokeshire League Division One - Champions (3): 1947–48; 1949–50; 1962–63
 Pembrokeshire League Division One - Runners-Up (5): 1945–46; 1946–47; 1950–51; 1960–61; 1961–62
 Pembrokeshire Senior Cup – Winners (4): 1959–60; 1960–61; 1961–62; 1962-63 
 Pembrokeshire Senior Cup – Runners-Up (3): 1949–50; 1950–51; 1990–91
 Pembrokeshire League Division Two - Champions (6): 1971–72; 1974–75; 1989–90; 1996–97; 1997–98; 2004–05
 Pembrokeshire League Division Two - Runners-Up (2): 2010–11; 2014–15
 Pembrokeshire League Division Three - Runners-Up (1): 1970–71 
 Pembrokeshire League Division Five - Runners-Up (1): 1992-95 (second team)
 Pembrokeshire League Reserves Division Two - Champions (2): 1997–98; 2004–05
 West Wales FA Senior Cup – Winners (3): 1937–38; 1978–79; 1985–86
 West Wales FA Senior Cup – Runners-Up (1): 1982-83

Welsh Football League history

Notes

References

External links
Official club Facebook
FCHD entry for the club

 
Sport in Pembrokeshire
1885 establishments in Wales
Association football clubs established in 1885
Pembrokeshire League clubs
Welsh Football League clubs